Mardi Gras: Spring Break is a 2011 comedy/road trip film. It stars Nicholas D'Agosto, Josh Gad, Bret Harrison, Arielle Kebbel, Danneel Harris, Regina Hall, and Carmen Electra. It is directed by Phil Dornfield.  The film follows a trio of senior college students who visit New Orleans during the Mardi Gras season.

Originally shot in 2008 as Max's Mardi Gras, it was scheduled for release by Sony Pictures' Screen Gems division.  It was shelved until September 2011, when Samuel Goldwyn Films released it in select cities.

Plot
Three best friends from Pennsylvania State University, Mike (Nicholas D'Agosto), Bump (Josh Gad), and Scottie (Bret Harrison), make their way to the annual Mardi Gras festival in New Orleans for "boobs, beads and brews." They are accompanied by Mike's clingy girlfriend, Erica (Danneel Harris).

Mike is disappointed to learn that Erica lied about grieving over the death of her grandfather so he would bring her along and then shocked when she connects with her friend Lucy (Arielle Kebbel) and flashes her breasts to the crowd. Meanwhile, it is revealed that Scottie actually reserved a restaurant table instead of a hotel room, forcing them all to spend the night on the street.

Ultimately, Mike decides it's time to leave his girlfriend and party with his friends.

Cast

 Nicholas D'Agosto as Mike
 Josh Gad as Bump
 Bret Harrison as Scottie
 Arielle Kebbel as Lucy
 Danneel Harris as Erica
 Regina Hall as Ann Marie
 Carmen Electra as herself
 Becky O'Donohue as Cousin Janice
 Jessie O'Donohue as Cousin Janine
 Jessica Heap as Oyster Chick
 Julin Jean as Sarah
 Gary Grubbs as Mr. Duluth
 Denise Williamson as Samantha
 J. Patrick McNamara as Professor Fleischman
 Danni Lang as Maxim Model
 Stephanie Honore as Bourbon Street Girl
 Marcelle Baer as Oyster Girl #1
 Genevieve Michelle as Domonique

Reception
Shockya panned the film, writing "There is some piecemeal — though very minuscule, it must be stressed – charm to some of Gad's energetic rants, and a riff about cowboy costumes having "jumped the gay shark" is mildly amusing. Otherwise, however, this is a movie which tries to wring its meager laughs from a scene in which shit literally hits the fan. Josh Heald's script is a recycled bunch of road trip cliches, and never very funny ones at that."

References

External links
 
 
 

2010s sex comedy films
American sex comedy films
Films shot in New Orleans
Films set in New Orleans
2010s comedy road movies
American comedy road movies
Screen Gems films
American teen comedy films
Films about spring break
Beacon Pictures films
Films produced by Armyan Bernstein
2011 comedy films
2011 films
2010s English-language films
2010s American films